Ricciotti Garibaldi (24 February 1847 – 17 July 1924) was an Italian soldier, the fourth son of Giuseppe Garibaldi and Anita Garibaldi.

Biography
Born in Montevideo, he was named in honour of  who had been executed during the failed expedition of the Bandiera Brothers against the Kingdom of Naples. He spent much of his youth in Nice, Caprera and England. 

In 1866, alongside his father, he took part in the Battle of Bezzecca (1866) and the Battle of Mentana (1867); in 1870, during his father's expedition in support to France during the Franco-Prussian War, he fought for the Army of the Vosges, during which he occupied Châtillon and, at Pouilly, during the Battle of Dijon, captured the sole Prussian flag lost during the war.

After a failed attempt to create market enterprises in America and Australia, he was a deputy in the Italian Parliament from 1887 to 1890. In the Turkish-Greek War in 1897, he fought with the Greek Army against the Ottomans with other Garibaldines.

He also had a daughter, Anita, who died in 1962.

Ricciotti Garibaldi died in Riofreddo in 1924.

Family tree

External links

Garibaldi family 
 

Italian people of Brazilian descent
Italian people of the Italian unification
Italian soldiers
Italian politicians
People from Montevideo
1847 births
1924 deaths
Italian philhellenes
Greek military personnel of the Greco-Turkish War (1897)
Garibaldi family